"Girls" is a song by American hip hop recording artist Kid Cudi, released on April 2, 2013 as the fourth single from his third studio album Indicud (2013). The song, which includes production by Cudi himself, features a guest appearance from fellow American rapper Too $hort. The song has since peaked at #3 on the Billboard Bubbling Under Hot 100 Singles.

Background
On April 2, 2013, "Girls" was released for digital download via the iTunes Store, as the album's fourth single. The song features a guest verse from American dirty rap legend Too Short. Additionally the song was produced by Cudi himself, much like the bulk of Indicud. The song would later be released to Rhythm/Crossover radio on April 9, 2013. "Girls" contains an interpolation of "Pretty Girls", written by The Kids of Widney High (Carl Brown, Shelly Goodhope, Tanesa Tavin, Daniel Brattain, Veronica Mendez, Darrell Mitchell, Albert Cota, Chantel Roquemore and Michael Monagan). The song also contains a sample of "Bitches (Reply)" as performed by Dion "DJ Jimi" Norman.

Charts

Release history

References

2013 singles
2013 songs
Kid Cudi songs
Too Short songs
GOOD Music singles
Song recordings produced by Kid Cudi
Songs written by Kid Cudi
Republic Records singles
Songs written by Too Short